Harvard Terrace is a historic neighborhood in Toledo, Ohio; it is "bordered by Amherst Drive (which abuts the Toledo Zoo), Broadway, Glendale Avenue, and the Anthony Wayne Trail. It includes 435 residences, many of them designed by architects and built in the early 1900s."

While partnered with George E. Pomeroy of the George E Pomeroy Co., E. H. Close developed the Harvard Terrace Neighborhood of Toledo, Ohio; later, in 1909, Close founded the E. H. Close Realty Company and went on to develop many areas in and around Toledo, including Ottawa Hills.

A historical review specialist for the Department of Neighborhoods conducted a survey of the neighborhood. He found that it was platted in 1902. One house was built in 1895; 100 houses were built by 1910; and most of the houses were built by 1925. There were seven architectural styles identified including Arts and Crafts, Bungalow, Prairie, and Colonial/ Georgian Revival.

Neighborhood attractions 

Maumee River
Toledo Zoo
Walbridge Park

Neighborhood clubs and organizations 

Maumee River Yacht Club (MRYC)
Toledo Sailing Club (TSC)

Public education 
Harvard Terrace is in the Toledo Public School District and the neighborhood students go to Harvard Elementary and Bowsher High School.

References

External links
 
 Walbridge Park
 Park (Congregational) Church: UCC
 Maumee River Yacht Club (MRYC)
 Toledo Sailing Club (TSC)

Neighborhoods in Toledo, Ohio